Court of Conscience may refer to:
 Court of equity, as opposed to court of law
 Court of conscience (debts), borough court chartered for recovery of small debts
 Court of Conscience (theology), concept held that one's conscience would testify for or against one's actions in life after death.